The year 1914 in film involved some significant events, including the debut of Cecil B. DeMille as a director.



Events
 February 2 – Charlie Chaplin's first film, Making a Living is released.
 February 7 – Release of Charlie Chaplin's second film, the Keystone comedy Kid Auto Races at Venice, in which his character of The Tramp is introduced to audiences (although first filmed in Mabel's Strange Predicament, released two days later).
 February 8 – Winsor McCay's Gertie the Dinosaur greatly advances filmed animation movement techniques.
 February 10 – Release of the film Hearts Adrift; the name of Mary Pickford, the star, is displayed above the title on movie marquees.
 February – Lewis J. Selznick and Arthur Spiegel organize the World Film Corporation, a distributor of independently produced films located in Fort Lee, New Jersey,
 March 8 – D. W. Griffith's first feature film, Judith of Bethulia, is released. It is his last production for the Biograph Company.
 March 20 – Tess of the Storm Country makes Mary Pickford an icon in the US and a celebrity around the world.
 March 31 – The serial The Perils of Pauline is an early example of the damsel in distress in film.
 April 12 – The 3,300-seat Mark Strand Theatre opens in New York City.
 April 18 – Cabiria, directed by Giovanni Pastrone, is released in Italy, the first epic film, featuring the first extensive use of a moving camera dolly in a feature film, and introducing the long-running character Maciste.
 May 8 – Paramount Pictures is formed as a film distributor by William Wadsworth Hodkinson.
 September – The Neptune Film Company opens the Neptune Studios (the first "dark stage" in England) at Borehamwood, north of London.
 November 19 – William Fox's Box Office Attractions Company releases its first production, Life's Shop Window.
 December 3 – William S. Hart appears in his first feature film, The Bargain, which makes him a star.
 December 21 – Release of the first American made feature-length comedy film, Tillie's Punctured Romance, which also contains Marie Dressler and Charlie Chaplin's feature film debuts.
 December – Chaplin joins Essanay Studios for $1,250 per week.
 Filoteo Alberini introduces a new 70 mm format, Panoramico, with the film Il sacco di Roma.

Highest-grossing films (U.S.)

Selected films with 1914 release dates
 January – The House of Bondage a lost 1914 silent film drama directed by Pierce Kingsley and starring Lottie Pickford.
 January 3 – Engelein, German silent comedy film written and directed by Urban Gad
 January 12 – Fantomas Part Four: Fantômas Contre Fantômas (Parts 1 through 3 of this serial were released in 1913, while Parts 4 & 5 were released in 1914)
 January 14 – Captive Souls a Hungarian film directed by Michael Curtiz 
 January 22 – Absinthe American silent drama film starring King Baggot and Leah Baird and directed by Herbert Brenon
 February 2 – Making a Living the first film starring Charlie Chaplin.
 February 5 – O Mimi San, starring Sessue Hayakawa, Tsuru Aoki and Mildred Harris
 February 7 – Kid Auto Races at Venice, starring Charlie Chaplin
 February 8 – Gertie the Dinosaur, an animated film that incorporated many cinematic innovations
 February 9 – Mabel's Strange Predicament, starring Mabel Normand and Charlie Chaplin
 February 12 – The Squaw Man, directed by Oscar Apfel and Cecil B. DeMille, starring Dustin Farnum
 March 1 - How Moscha Came Back,  silent film comedy short directed by Phillips Smalley
 March 8 – Judith of Bethulia, directed by D. W. Griffith, starring Blanche Sweet
 March 24 – The Avenging Conscience, directed by D. W. Griffith, starring Blanche Sweet and Henry B. Walthall; loosely based on the works of Edgar Allan Poe
 March 31 – The Perils of Pauline, (serial), starring Pearl White
 April 6 – The Old Curiosity Shop directed by Thomas Bentley, starring Alma Taylor
 April 15 – Brewster's Millions
 April 18 – Cabiria, directed by Giovanni Pastrone
 April 18 – Mabel at the Wheel, starring Mabel Normand, Harry McCoy, and Charlie Chaplin
 April 23 – A Little Madonna
 May ?  - Fantomas Part Five: Le Faux Magistrat
 May 11 – The Master Mind
 May – Mr. Barnes of New York
 June 8 – The Wrath of Gods, starring Sessue Hayakawa, Tsuru Aoki and Frank Borzage
 June 12 – Der Hund von Baskerville aka The Hound of the Baskervilles (Germany/ Vitascope), directed by Rudolf Meinert, written by Richard Oswald, starring Alwin Neuß and Hanni Weiss; originally released in two parts, later edited down into a feature version.
 June 15 – The Only Son
 June 22 – The Million Dollar Mystery, (serial), starring Florence La Badie
 July 13 – My Official Wife, starring Clara Kimball Young
 July 13 – The Man on the Box
 July 17 – The Stain, starring Theda Bara
 July 22 – By the Sun's Rays
 August 10 – The Call of the North, starring Robert Edeson
 September 7 – The Virginian, starring Dustin Farnum
 September 22 – Ireland a Nation
 September 23 – The Aztec Treasure
 September 28 – The Patchwork Girl of Oz
 September 28 – The Magic Cloak of Oz, starring Mildred Harris
 October 14 – His Majesty, the Scarecrow of Oz, starring Mildred Harris
 October 14 – Mabel's Blunder
 October 22 – What's His Name, starring Max Figman
 November 2 – Salomy Jane
 November 7 – The Hazards of Helen, (serial), starring Helen Holmes
 November 7 – His Musical Career, starring Charlie Chaplin
 November 9 – The Man from Home
 November 9 – The Wishing Ring
 November 13 – Ayastefanos'taki Rus Abidesinin Yıkılışı, directed by Fuat Uzkınay, considered to be the first Turkish movie – (Ottoman Empire)
 November 15 – Rose of the Rancho, starring Bessie Barriscale
 November 19 – Life's Shop Window, first film produced by William Fox's Box Office Attractions Company, the forerunner to Fox Film
 December 7 – The Ghost Breaker (Paramount) directed by Cecil B. DeMille and Oscar C. Apfel, starring H. B. Warner and Rita Stanwood; remade in 1922 and again in 1940.
 December 7 – His Prehistoric Past, written, directed, and starring Charlie Chaplin
 December 7 – In the Land of the Head Hunters
 December 14 – The Last Egyptian, produced and written by L. Frank Baum, directed by Joseph Farrell MacDonald (who also starred), also starring Howard Davies and Jefferson Osborne.     
 December 21 – Tillie's Punctured Romance, directed by Mack Sennett, starring Marie Dressler, Mabel Normand and Charlie Chaplin.  First comedy feature film.
 December 28 – A Study in Scarlet, directed by George Pearson; based on the Arthur Conan Doyle story
 December 28 – Cinderella, starring Mary Pickford
 December 28 – The Exploits of Elaine, (serial), directed by Louis Gasnier and George B. Seitz, starring Pearl White and Sheldon Lewis

Other films released in 1914
 Absinthe (Imp/ Universal) written and directed by Herbert Brenon, starring King Baggot and Leah Baird; filmed in Paris, France; re-released in 1916.
 Across the Pacific, written and directed by Edwin Carewe (based on the play by Charles E. Blaney), starring Dorothy Dalton and Sam Hines.
 Alice in Wonderland (Maienthau Prods.) based on the novel by Lewis Carroll. A 16mm. reduction positive print still exists.
 Alone With the Devil aka Ekspressens Mysterium (Denmark/ Nordisk) directed by Hjalmar Davidsen, starring Cristel Holch, Carl Lauritzen and Valdemar Psilander 
 Bancho Sarayashika (Japanese/ Nikkatsu) ghost story directed by Shozo Makino, starring Matsunosuke Onoe, based on a 19th-century Kabuki play by Segawa Joko III.
 The Basilisk (British/ Hepworth) written and directed by Cecil B. Hepworth, starring William Felton and Alma Taylor;  yet another adaptation of George du Maurier's 1894 novel Trilby; prints were tinted green for theatrical release.
 Batty Bill and the Suicide Club (French/ Gaston Melies) one of ten "Batty Bill" short comedies released in 1914.
 The Bells (British/ Gaumont) starring H. B. Irving, Frank Keenan and Joseph Dowling, based on the Erckmann-Chatrian novel Le Juif Polonaise; some sources claim this film was announced but never actually made.
 The Bells (U.S./ Sawyer's Features) yet another (lost) adaptation of the Erckmann-Chatrian novel Le Juif Polonaise 
 Botan Doro/ translation: The Peony Lantern (Japanese/ Nikkatsu Kyoto) one of the earliest Japanese horror films, directed by Shozo Makino, starring Matsunosuke Onoe; based on a 1892 Kabuki play called Kaidan Botan Doro.
 By the Sun's Rays (Universal) starring Lon Chaney, Agnes Vernon and Murdock MacQuarrie; Chaney's earliest existing film. 
 A Christmas Carol (British) written and directed by Harold Shaw, starring Charles Rock and George Bellamy; based on the Charles Dickens novel.
 The Chimes (British/ Hepworth) written and directed by Thomas Bentley, produced by Cecil Hepworth, starring Warwick Buckland and Stewart Rome, based on the story by Charles Dickens.
 The Chimes (U.S. Amusement Corp.) another adaptation of the Charles Dickens story;  written and directed by Herbert Blache, starring Tom Terriss and Faye Cusick.
 The Crimson Moth (Biograph) directed by Travis Vale, starring Jack Drumier and Louise Vale (who died of the Spanish Flu in 1918).
 The Crown of Richard III (French/Pathe) remade in U.S. in 1939 as Tower of London
 Curse of the Scarabee Ruby (Gaumont/Eclipse/Urban) a French-British co-production inspired by both of the novels The Moonstone and Trilby, produced by Charles Urban.
 A Deal with the Devil aka Den Mystiske Fremmede (Denmark/ Nordisk) directed by Holger-Madsen,  starring Olaf Fonss, Ebba Thomsen and Alf Blutecher; storyline was based on Faust.
 The Diamond of Disaster (Thanhouser Films) directed by Carroll Fleming, written by Fleming's brother Phil Lonergan, starring J. S. Murray and Ernest Warde
 Discord and Harmony (Gold Seal/ Universal) directed by Allan Dwan, starring Lon Chaney, Pauline Bush and Murdock MacQuarrie
 Dr. Jekyll and Mr. Hyde Done to a Frazzle (Crystal-Superba/ Warners) satire of the Robert Louis Stevenson novella, starring Charles De Forrest
 Doctor Polly (Vitagraph) A haunted house comedy directed by Wilfred North and Wally Van, starring Lillian Walker, Josie Sadler and Wally Van.
 The Dream Woman (Blache Prods.) written and directed by Alice Guy-Blache, starring Fraunie Fraunholz and Claire Whitney; based on the 1859 Wilkie Collins novel, The Woman in White
 The Embezzler (Gold Seal/ Universal) directed by Allan Dawan, starring Lon Chaney, Pauline Bush and Murdock MacQuarrie
 The End of the Feud (Universal) directed by Allan Dwan, starring Lon Chaney, Pauline Bush and Murdock MacQuarrie.
 The Fakir's Spell (British/ Dreadnought Films) directed by Frank Newman, starring Idleton Newman; features a killer ape; some plot elements from this film turned up later in The Reptile (1965) and The Oblong Box (1969).
 The Forbidden Room, aka The Web of Circumstance (Bison/ Universal Pictures) directed by Allan Dwan, starring Murdock MacQuarrie, Pauline Bush and Lon Chaney;  a lost film.
 The Forces of Evil, aka The Dominant Will (Eclair/ Leading Players) based on the George du Maurier novel Trilby.
 Fune Yurei, translation Ghost Ship (Japanese/ Nikkatsu) directed by Shozo Makino, starring Matsunosuke Onoe 
 The Ghost of the Mine (Eclair American) starring Robert Frazer and Edna Payne; filmed in Tucson, Arizona; an early horror-western hybrid.
 Ghosts (British/ Close Prods.) produced by Elwin Neame and (his wife) Ivy Close (who starred in the film).
 Guarding Britain's Secrets, aka The Fiends of Hell (British/ Walturdaw) directed by Charles Calvert, starring Douglas Payne and Dr. Nikola Hamilton (who also wrote the screenplay).
 Hands Invisible (Powers Films) written and directed by Edwin August, who also starred in it;  similar in plot to the later Hands of Orlac (1920).
 Her Bounty (Universal) directed by Joseph De Grasse, starring Lon Chaney and Pauline Bush
 Her Escape (Universal) directed by Joseph De Grasse, starring Lon Chaney and Pauline Bush; Chaney plays a blind man in this film.
 Her Grave Mistake (Universal) starring Lon Chaney, Murdock MacQuarrie and Agnes Vernon 
 Her Life's Story (Universal) directed by Joseph De Grasse, starring Lon Chaney and Pauline Bush; based on a poem "The Cross" by Miriam Bade Rasmus.
 Hidden Death, aka La Mort qui Frole (French/ Gaumont Films) directed by Jean Durand 
 The Higher Law (Universal) directed by Charles Giblyn, starring Lon Chaney and Pauline Bush, a sequel to The Oubliette (1914).
 The Honor of the Mounted (Gold Seal/ Universal) directed by Allan Dwan, starring Lon Chaney and Pauline Bush
 The Hopes of Blind Alley (Universal) directed by Allan Dwan, starring Lon Chaney and Pauline Bush
 The Hound of the Baskervilles aka La Chien des Baskerville (French/ Pathe) another adaptation of the famous novel by Arthur Conan Doyle
The Hound of the Baskervilles Parts 1 and 2 (German film); Part One was called "The Hound of the Baskervilles" and Part Two was called "The Solitary House"; directed by Rudolf Meinert for Vitascope, written by Richard Oswald, starring Alwin Neuss as Sherlock Holmes; later edited down into a single feature version; two concluding parts came out in 1915 (see 1915 for Parts 3 and 4)
 The House of Fear (U.S./ Lubin) directed by Siegmund Lubin, starring Rosetta Brice; based on a story by Emmett C. Hall.
 The Hypnotic Violinist (Denmark/ Filmfabrikken) starring Emilie Sannom, Rasmus Ottesen and Soren Fjelstrup
 The Imp Abroad (Victor Films) produced and directed by Harry Rivier, starring Rupert Julian and Elsie Jane Wilson.
 The Invisible Power (Kalem) directed by George Melford, starring Paul Hurst and William H. West, yet another film adaptation of the George du Maurier novel Trilby.
 Jane Eyre (Imp/ Universal Pictures) directed by Frank Hall Crane, starring Ethel Grandin and Irving Cummings, based on the 1847 Charlotte Bronte novel.
 Jane Eyre (Whitman) directed by Martin Faust, starring Lisbeth Blackstone, John Charles and Mary Fry Clements
 Kaidan Asamagatake, aka The Ghost Story of Mount Asamagatake (Japanese/ Nikkatsu) directed by Shozo Makino, starring Matsunosuke Onoe.
 The Lamb, the Woman, the Wolf (Bison/ Universal) written and directed by Allan Dwan, starring Lon Chaney, Murdock MacQuarrie and Pauline Bush
 The Lie (Gold Seal/ Universal) directed by Allan Dwan, starring Lon Chaney and Murdock MacQuarrie
 Lights and Shadows (Universal) directed by Joseph De Grasse, starring Lon Chaney and Pauline Bush.
 The Lion, the Lamb, the Man (Universal) directed by Joseph De Grasse, starring Lon Chaney, Pauline Bush and Millard K. Wilson
 The Menace to Carlotta (Rex/ Universal) directed by Allan Dwan, written by Lon Chaney, starring Lon Chaney, Murdock MacQuarrie and Pauline Bush.
 A Miner's Romance (Universal) starring Lon Chaney and Murdock MacQuarrie
 The Miser's Conversion (Thanhouser) starring Sydney Bracy; features man-into-ape transformation.
 Murders in the Rue Morgue (Rosenberg Films) based on the story by Edgar Allan Poe
 The Mystery of Edwin Drood, co-directed by Herbert Blache and Tom Terriss, starring Tom Terriss and Rodney Hickok; based on the 1870 Charles Dickens novel; film was remade again in 1935 by Universal Pictures.
 The Mystery of Grayson Hall (Eclair Films) starring Lindsay J. Hall and Fred Hearn
 Naidra, the Dream Worker (Edison Prods.) features a cursed mummy's necklace.
 The Necklace of Rameses (Thomas Edison Prods.) directed by Charles Brabin, starring William Bechtel and Gertrude Braun.
 A Night of Thrills (Universal/ Rex) directed by Joseph De Grasse, starring Lon Chaney and Pauline Bush; a haunted house comedy.
 Okazaki no neko, translation: The Ghost-Cat of Okazaki (Nikkatsu) directed by Shozo Makino, starring Matsunosuke Onoe; based on an 1827 kabuki play which in turn was based on an 1820s Japanese novel called Shank's Mare.
 The Old Cobbler (Universal) directed by Murdock MacQuarrie (who also starred in the film), also starring Lon Chaney and Agnes Vernon
 The Oubliette (Universal) medieval adventure film directed by Charles Giblyn, starring Lon Chaney and Murdock MacQuarrie; film still exists.
 Out of the Far East (Imp/ Universal Pictures) directed by Frank H. Crane, starring Stuart Paton and Leah Baird; re-released in 1917 as Eyes in the Dark.
 The Phantom Light (Bison Films) directed by Henry McRae, starring William Clifford and Marie Walcamp
 The Phantom Violin (Universal Pictures) directed by Francis Ford (who also starred in the film), starring Grace Cunard (who also wrote the screenplay) and Harry Schumm.
 The Quest for the Sacred Jewel (U.S.-French co-production/ Pathe) directed by George Fitzmaurice, starring Charles Arling and Edna Mayo;  another adaptation of the 1868 Wilkie Collins novel, The Moonstone.
 A Ranch Romance (Nestor/ Universal) starring Murdock MacQuarrie, Lon Chaney and Agnes Vernon
 Remember Mary Magdalen (Victor/ Universal) directed by Allan Dwan, starring Lon Chaney, Murdock MacQuarrie and Pauline Bush
 Richelieu (Universal) directed by Allan Dwan, starring Lon Chaney, Murdock MacQuarrie and Pauline Bush.
 Ruslan i Ljudmila (Russian) directed by Ladislav Starevich, starring Ivan Mosjoukine as Satan; based on the poem by Alexander Pushkin.
 Ein Seltsamer Fall (translation: A Strange Case) (Germany/ Vitascope) directed by Max Mack, written by Richard Oswald, starring Alwin Neuss and Hanni Weiss; an unofficial film adaptation of the Robert Louis Stevenson novella Dr. Jekyll and Mr. Hyde; existing prints run about 30 minutes instead of the original's 50-minute length.
 A Small Town Girl (Universal) directed by Allan Dwan, starring Lon Chaney, Pauline Bush and Rupert Julian; film was released in November, 1914, although some sources say 1915.
 The Spiritist, aka The Spiritualist (Denmark/ Nordisk) directed by Holger Madsen, starring Marie Dinesen and Vibeke Kroyer
 The Strange Case of Princess Khan, produced by William G. Selig, directed by Edward J. LeSaint, starring Stella Razeto
A Study in Scarlet (British) directed by George Pearson, based on the famous Arthur Conan Doyle novel, starring James Bragington as Sherlock Holmes
A Study in Scarlet (U.S.) directed by Francis Ford for Universal Pictures, based on the famous Arthur Conan Doyle novel, starring Francis Ford as Sherlock Holmes and Jack Francis as Watson        
 The Suicide Club (British/ Apex Films) produced by Maurice Elvey, starring Elizabeth Risdon and Montagu Love; based on the story by Robert Louis Stevenson, which was remade in 1936 as Trouble for Two.
 Svengali (Austrian/ Wiener Kunstfilm) directed by Luise Kolm and Jakob Fleck, starring Ferdinand Bonn; based on the novel Trilby by George du Maurier.
 The Temptations of Satan (U.S. Amusement) directed by Herbert Blache, starring Vinnie Burns, Fraunie Fraunholz and James O'Neill as Satan.
 The Tragedy of Whispering Creek (Bison/ Universal) written and directed by Allan Dwan, starring Lon Chaneyand Pauline Bush 
 Trilby (British) produced by Harold Shaw, starring Herbert Tree and Viva Birkett; based on George du Maurier's novel of the same name.
 The Unlawful Trade (Rex/Universal) written and directed by Allan Dwan, starring Lon Chaney, Pauline Bush and Murdock MacQuarrie 
 The Vampire (Eclair Films) plot features a large vampire bat.
 Vendetta (French/ Eclipse) directed by Louis Mereanton, starring Regina Badet; based on the novel of the same name by Marie Corelli.
 The Vij (Russian) written and directed by Ladislas Starevitch, starring Ivan Mosjoukine and Olga Obolenskaya; based on the story by Gogol; remade later as Black Sunday (1960).
 Virtue Is Its Own Reward, aka Virtue Its Own Reward (Universal) directed by Joseph De Grasse, starring Lon Chaney and Pauline Bush
 The White Spectre (General Films)
 The White Wolf (Nestor Films/ Universal) plot involves a werewolf transformation.
 Woman of Mystery (Blache Prods.) written and directed by Alice Guy-Blache; starring Vinnie Burns, Claire Whitney and Fraunie Fraunholz; plot involves split personalities and spirit control.
 Yoshiwara kaidan: Teburi bozu (Japanese/ Nikkatsu) directed by Shozo Makino, starring Matsunosuke Onoe; another adaptation of the 1825 Japanese kabuki play, Yotsuya kaidan.

Short film series
 Broncho Billy Anderson (1910–1916)
 Harold Lloyd (1913–1921)
 Charlie Chaplin (1914–1923)

Births
January 5 – George Reeves, actor (died 1959)
January 6 – Danny Thomas, singer, actor, comedian (died 1991)
January 13 – Osa Massen, Danish actress (died 2006)
January 14 – Harold Russell, actor (died 2002)
January 15 – Dimples Cooper, Filipina actress (died 1960)
January 30 – John Ireland, actor (died 1992)
January 31 - Carey Loftin, American stuntman, stunt coordinator and actor (died 1997)
February 3 – Mary Carlisle, actress (died 2018)
February 6 – Thurl Ravenscroft, actor, singer (died 2005)
February 15 – Kevin McCarthy, actor (died 2010)
February 17 – Arthur Kennedy, actor (died 1990)
February 18 – Mahmoud Zulfikar, director (died 1970)
February 21 – Zachary Scott, actor (died 1965)
February 26 – Robert Alda, actor (died 1986)
March 2 – Martin Ritt, director (died 1990)
March 3 – Charlotte Henry, actress (died 1980)
March 27 – Richard Denning, actor (died 1998)
April 2 – Alec Guinness, actor (died 2000)
April 4 – Richard Coogan, actor (died 2014)
April 14 – John Hubbard, actor (died 1988)
April 16 – John Hodiak, actor (died 1955)
May 5 – Tyrone Power, actor (died 1958)
May 19 – Beverly Roberts, actress, singer (died 2009)
May 24 – Lilli Palmer, actress (died 1986)
May 31 – Hannes Schiel, Austrian actor (died 2017)
June 7 – Khwaja Ahmad Abbas, director (died 1987)
June 18 – E. G. Marshall, actor (died 1998)
June 21 – Wensley Pithey, character actor (died 1993)
July 2 - Ethelreda Leopold, American actress (died 1998)  
July 20 - Masa Niemi, Finnish comic actor (died 1960)
July 23 - Julie Mitchum, actress (died 2003)
July 29 – Irwin Corey, comedian (died 2017) 
July 31 – Louis de Funès, actor (died 1983)
August 2 – Beatrice Straight, actress (died 2001) 
August 5 – Parley Baer, actor (died 2002)
August 14 – Andrea Leeds, actress (died 1984)
August 31 – Richard Basehart, actor (died 1984)
September 10 – Robert Wise, director (died 2005)
September 12 – Desmond Llewelyn, actor (died 1999)
September 20 – Kenneth More English actor (died 1982)
September 27 – Sophie Sooäär, Estonian actress and singer (d. 1996)
October 1 – Maciej Maciejewski, Polish screen and stage actor (died 2018)
October 9 - Edward Andrews, American actor (died 1985)
October 26 – Jackie Coogan, actor (died 1984)
October 28 - Dody Goodman, American character actress (died 2008)
October 30 – Anna Wing, actress (died 2013)
November 6 - Jonathan Harris, (died 2002)
November 8 – Norman Lloyd, actor (died 2021)
November 9
Alan Caillou, English actor and screenwriter (died 2006)
Hedy Lamarr, actress (died 2000)
November 10 – William Henry, actor (died 1982)
November 13
Amelia Bence, actress (died 2016)
Henri Langlois, film preservationist (died 1977)
Alberto Lattuada, director (died 2005)
November 23
Roger Avon, British film and television actor (died 1998)
Ellen Drew, American actress (died 2003)
December 10 – Dorothy Lamour, actress (died 1996)
December 13 – Larry Parks, actor (died 1975)
December 26 – Richard Widmark, actor (died 2008)
December 28 – Lee Bowman, actor (died 1979)

Deaths
 January 9 – Gladys Rankin, American actress as Mrs. Sidney Drew; writer as George Cameron
 January 11 – William A. Russell, 35, American actor
 March 25 – Frédéric Mistral, 83, French writer, Mirèio
 June 19 – Brandon Thomas, 65, British writer, Charley's Aunt
 July 1
 Grace McHugh, American actress died while filming the movie Across the Border
 Owen Carter, American cinematographer died while trying to save Grace McHugh, Across the Border
 August 21 – Charles J. Hite, 38, President and CEO of Thanhouser Film Corporation
 August 22 – David Davie Shelby, 66, actor.
 October 24 – Gustav Wied, 56, Danish playwright and novelist
 November 14 – Stellan Rye, 34, Danish film director, Dur Verfuhrte, Evinrude, The Student of Prague

Film debuts
 Theda Bara – The Stain (as Theodosia Goodman)
 Ethel Barrymore – The Nightingale
 John Barrymore – An American Citizen
 Milton Berle (at 6 years old) – Bunny's Little Brother (short, uncredited)
 Charlie Chaplin – writer, Kid Auto Races at Venice (short, uncredited); actor, Making a Living (short); director, Twenty Minutes of Love (short, unconfirmed)
 Marguerite Clark – Wildflower
 Henrietta Crosman – The Unwelcome Mrs. Hatch
 Dorothy Dalton – Pierre of the Plains
 Hazel Dawn – One of Our Girls
 Cecil B. DeMille – director, The Squaw Man
 Sam De Grasse – Texas Bill's Last Ride (short)
 Gaby Deslys – La remplacante (short) 
 Oliver Hardy – Outwitting Dad (short) (as O. N. Hardy)
 Sessue Hayakawa – O Mimi San (short)
 Emil Jannings – Passionels Tagebuch
 Thomas Meighan – Danny Donovan, the Gentleman Cracksman (short)
 Adolphe Menjou – The Acid Test (short, uncredited)
 Beatriz Michelena – Salomy Jane
 Musidora – Sainte-Odile (short) 
 Pola Negri – Slave of Passion, Slave of Vice
 Tyrone Power, Sr. – Aristocracy (as Tyrone Power)
 Milton Sills – The Pit
 Gloria Swanson – The Song of the Soul (short, unconfirmed)
 Constance Talmadge – Buddy's First Call (short)
 Rudolph Valentino – The Battle of the Sexes (uncredited)
 H. B. Warner – The Lost Paradise

References

 
Film by year